Bandalungwa is a municipality (commune) in the Funa district of Kinshasa, the capital city of the Democratic Republic of the Congo.

Its northern portion is occupied by the military barracks of Kokolo, whose buildings prominently display traditional Flemish architecture. The barracks are separated from residential areas such as the "Block" by Kasavubu Avenue.

Demographics

References

See also

Communes of Kinshasa
Funa District